Johan Jørgen Holst (29 November 1937 – 13 January 1994) was a Norwegian politician representing Labour, best known for his involvement with the Oslo Accords.

Holst was Minister of Defence from 1987 to 1989 and from 1990 to April 1993. He then became Minister of Foreign Affairs, a position he held to his death. During his time in the Ministry of Foreign Affairs he was heavily involved in the process that led to the Oslo Accords. He suffered a minor stroke in December 1993 and was admitted to a hospital. He never fully recovered and died a month later. His wife Marianne Heiberg later said that he had worked himself to death with the peace process.

In his memory, the city of Gaza created the Holst Park, an activity center for children of Gaza from 6 to 16. Holst was educated at Oslo Cathedral School, where he completed his examen artium in 1956. He then completed his mandatory military service at the prestigious Russian language program of the Norwegian Armed Forces. He then studied at Columbia College of Columbia University, where he obtained his A.B. in 1960 and where he was honored with its John Jay Award for Distinguished Professional Achievement shortly after his death—the first time the prize had been given posthumously. Through his marriage Mr. Holst was the uncle of Jens Stoltenberg, the prime minister of Norway throughout central parts of the 2000s.
Friends of Israel in the Norwegian Labour Movement (Norwegian: Venner av Israel i Norsk Arbeiderbevegelse), planted a forest to his memory in Israel.

References

External links
 Civilian-Based Defense in a New Era (free download), a short monograph by Holst
 “Johan Holst, 56, Dies; Helped Israel-P.L.O. Talks,” Associated Press, Jan. 14, 1994

1937 births
1994 deaths
Labour Party (Norway) politicians
Foreign Ministers of Norway
Norwegian state secretaries
Norwegian political scientists
Israeli–Palestinian peace process
Columbia College (New York) alumni
University of Oslo alumni
People educated at Oslo Cathedral School
Defence ministers of Norway
20th-century political scientists